A recreation reserve is a type of New Zealand protected area. Many provide public access to coastlines, lakes and rivers.

According to Te Ara - the Encyclopedia of New Zealand, there 2,842 recreation reserves in New Zealand in 2015, covering total of 255,750 hectares. Land Information New Zealand listed 599 Recreation Reserves in 2022.

Most Recreation Reserves are smaller than 1000 hectares, but some are much larger. Te Paki in Northland covers nearly 19,000 hectares of coastal landscape. Pūponga Farm Park, at the western end of Farewell Spit, is also large. Other well-known Recreation Reserves include Pelorus Bridge and the reserves of the Marlborough Sounds, and Five Mile, Whakaipo, and other reserves around Lake Taupō.

North Island

Northland Region

 Ahipara Recreation Reserve
 Arai-Te-Uru Recreation Reserve
 Bland Bay Recreation Reserve
 Flagstaff Hill Recreation Reserve
 Hauparua Inlet Recreation Reserve
 Hongi Hika Recreation Reserve
 Hukatere Hall Recreation Reserve
 Kaiwaka Park Domain Recreation Reserve
 Kawakawa Domain Recreation Reserve
 Kerikeri Basin Recreation Reserve
 Koutu Point Recreation Reserve
 Lake Ngākeketo Recreation Reserve
 Lake Ngatu Recreation Reserve
 Langs Beach Recreation Reserve
 Maitai Bay Recreation Reserve
 Mangapai Domain Recreation Reserve
 Mangonui Domain Recreation Reserve
 Mangonui Recreation Reserve
 Marua Recreation Reserve
 Matauwhi Bay Recreation Reserve
 Matauwhi Road Recreation Reserve
 Maungakaramea Domain Recreation Reserve
 Motuarohia Island Recreation Reserve
 Motu Kiore Island Recreation Reserve
 Motutara Recreation Reserve
 Oakura Beach Domain Recreation Reserve
 Ocean Beach Recreation Reserve
 Otamure Recreation Reserve
 Otehei Bay Recreation Reserve
 Pahi Domain Recreation Reserve
 Paparahi Point Recreation Reserve
 Parakao Domain Recreation Reserve
 Parnell Street Recreation Reserve
 Pataua Island Recreation Reserve
 Pitt Street Recreation Reserve
 Puwheke Recreation Reserve
 Ruakaka Domain Recreation Reserve
 Signal Station Road Recreation Reserve
 Springfield Domain Recreation Reserve
 Taronui Bay Recreation Reserve
 Taumarumaru Recreation Reserve
 Te Paki Recreation Reserve
 Titipu Island Recreation Reserve
 Tutukaka Recreation Reserve
 Uretiti Recreation Reserve
 Urupukapuka Island Recreation Reserve
 Waewaetorea Island Recreation Reserve
 Waikiekie Domain Recreation Reserve
 Waimamaku Hall Site Recreation Reserve
 Waiotira Domain Recreation Reserve
 Waipu Cove Domain Recreation Reserve
 Whakanekeneke Recreation Reserve
 Whananaki South Recreation Reserve
 Whareora Recreation Reserve
 Whatitiri Domain Recreation Reserve

Auckland Region

 Auckland Mataatua Society Marae Recreation Reserve
 Awana Bay Recreation Reserve
 Awana Stream Recreation Reserve
 Bastion Point Recreation Reserve
 Beehive Island Recreation Reserve
 Browns Island Recreation Reserve
 Bushs Beach Recreation Reserve
 Claris Recreation Reserve
 Drury Creek Islands Recreation Reserve
 Fitzroy Bay Landing Recreation Reserve
 Harataonga Recreation Reserve
 Hilltop Recreation Reserve
 Kaipara Hills Recreation Reserve
 Leigh Recreation Reserve
 Kaipara Hills Recreation Reserve
 Leigh Recreation Reserve
 Mahurangi Park Recreation Reserve
 Medlands Recreation Reserve
 Motuihe Island Recreation Reserve
 Motuora Island Recreation Reserve
 Motutapu Island Recreation Reserve
 Okiwi Recreation Reserve
 Oruawharo Creek Recreation Reserve
 Pa Point Recreation Reserve
 Rakino Island Recreation Reserve
 Schoolhouse Bay Recreation Reserve
 Spectacle Lake Recreation Reserve
 Stony Beach Recreation Reserve
 Stony Hill Recreation Reserve
 Te Henga Recreation Reserve
 Thorne Bay Recreation Reserve

Bay of Plenty Region

 Aongatete Recreation Reserve
 Arikikapakapa Recreation Reserve
 Galatea Recreation Reserve
 Hamurana Springs Recreation Reserve
 Hukutaia Domain Recreation Reserve
 Island View Recreation Reserve
 Kutarere Recreation Reserve
 Lake Rerewhakaaitu Recreation Reserve
 Lower Kaimai Domain Recreation Reserve
 Matata Recreation Reserve
 Mount Maunganui Domain Recreation Reserve
 Murupara Domain Recreation Reserve
 Ohinekoao Recreation Reserve
 Ohope Recreation Reserve
 Oruaiti Beach Recreation Reserve
 Otao Domain Recreation Reserve
 Port Ohope Recreation Reserve
 Pukeroa Recreation Reserve
 Rotorua Domain Recreation Reserve
 Tarawera River Recreation Reserve
 Te Ngae Junction Recreation Reserve
 Te Tapahoro Recreation Reserve
 Te Teko Recreation Reserve
 Tikitapu Recreation Reserve
 Waimana Recreation Reserve

Gisborne Region

 Anaura Bay Recreation Reserve
 Cleary Road Recreation Reserve
 Donners Bush Recreation Reserve
 Ormond Kohi Bush Recreation Reserve
 Waipiro Bay Recreation Reserve

Hawke's Bay Region

 Clive Grange Recreation Reserve
 Elsthorpe Domain Recreation Reserve
 Farndon Park Domain
 Glenfalls Recreation Reserve
 Hatuma Domain Recreation Reserve
 Hutchinson Domain Recreation Reserve
 Kotemaori Domain Recreation Reserve
 Morere Recreation Reserve
 Putorino Domain Recreation Reserve
 Te Kuta Recreation Reserve
 Te Pohue Upper Mohaka Recreation Reserve
 Tutira Domain Recreation Reserve
 Waitara / Glenfalls Recreation Reserve

Manawatū-Whanganui Region

 Aramoana Domain Recreation Reserve
 Broadway Recreation Reserve
 Dews Road Recreation Reserve
 Erua Recreation Reserve
 Harbour Recreation Reserve
 Junction Recreation Reserve
 Karioi Domain Recreation Reserve
 Kiosk Recreation Reserve
 Kiwi Road Recreation Reserve
 Koitiata Domain Recreation Reserve
 Kumeroa Domain Recreation Reserve
 Manawatu Recreation Reserve
 Manganui o te Ao Recreation Reserve
 Manganui Valley Recreation Reserve
 Mangaweka Recreation Reserve
 Marton Golf Club Recreation Reserve
 Matamau Recreation Reserve
 Mikonui Memorial Recreation Reserve
 Niho Domain Recreation Reserve
 Nukumaru Recreation Reserve
 Ohinepane Recreation Reserve
 Ongarue Recreation Reserve
 Owhango Domain Recreation Reserve
 Pohangina Valley Domain Recreation Reserve
 Poukiore Recreation Reserve
 South Street Recreation Reserve
 Taihape Recreation Reserve
 Tangimoana Dunes Recreation Reserve
 Taringamotu Recreation Reserve
 Taumarunui/Rangaroa Recreation Reserve
 Torere Recreation Reserve
 Tui Domain Recreation Reserve
 Turakina Recreation Reserve
 Victoria Domain Recreation Reserve
 Wahipai Recreation Reserve
 Waihemo Recreation Reserve

South Island

Nelson District

 Aniseed Valley Recreation Reserve
 Boulder Bank Recreation Reserve
 Cable Bay Recreation Reserve

Marlborough District

 Bankhouse Recreation Reserve
 Bay Of Many Coves Recreation Reserve
 Betty Archer Recreation Reserve
 Blind River Recreation Reserve
 Bulwer Recreation Reserve
 Camp Bay Recreation Reserve
 Carluke Recreation Reserve
 Elaine Bay Recreation Reserve
 Endeavour Inlet Recreation Reserve
 Four Fathom Bay Recreation Reserve
 French Pass Recreation Reserve
 Governors Bay Recreation Reserve
 Grovetown Recreation Reserve
 Hakahaka Bay Recreation Reserve
 Havelock Recreation Reserve
 Karaka Point Recreation Reserve
 Kart Raceway Recreation Reserve
 King-Turner Scenic Reserve
 Koromiko Recreation Reserve
 Lake Grassmere Recreation Reserve
 Lochmara West Bay Recreation Reserve
 Marfells Beach Recreation Reserve
 Mistletoe Bay Recreation Reserve
 Moenui Recreation Reserve
 Molesworth Recreation Reserve
 Momorangi Bay Recreation Reserve
 Ngakuta Bay Recreation Reserve
 Nydia Bay Recreation Reserve
 Okiwi Bay Recreation Reserve
 Okoha Recreation Reserve
 Opua Bay Recreation Reserve
 Pelorus Bridge Recreation Reserve
 Picton Botanic Reserve
 Picton Recreation Reserve
 Pipi Beach Recreation Reserve
 Portage Bay Recreation Reserve
 Rarangi Recreation Reserve
 Ratimera Bay Recreation Reserve
 Red Point Recreation Reserve
 Robin Hood Bay Recreation Reserve
 Ronga Recreation Reserve
 Round Hill Recreation Reserve
 Ruakaka Recreation Reserve
 Seddon Recreation Reserve
 Tawa Bay Recreation Reserve
 Taylor Dam Recreation Reserve
 Tipi Bay Recreation Reserve
 Titirangi Farm Park
 Waimaru Recreation and Scenic Reserve
 Waitohi Stream Recreation Reserve
 Wakaterepapanui Island Recreation Reserve
 Whangarae Bay Recreation Reserve
 Wharehunga Bay Recreation Reserve
 Whatamango Bay Recreation Reserve
 Whatanihi Recreation Reserve
 Whites Bay Recreation Reserve

Canterbury Region

 Admirals Scenic Reserve
 Arundel Recreation Reserve
 Caledonian Sports Ground
 Campbell Park Recreation Reserve
 Carleton Domain Reserve
 Cattle Creek Recreation Reserve
 Cave Recreation Reserve
 Clarkville Hall Recreation Reserve
 Conway River Recreation Reserve
 Courtenay Recreation Reserve
 Darfield Domain
 Ellesmere Recreation Reserve
 Goose Bay-Omihi Recreation Reserve
 Greendale Recreation Reserve
 Hammond Point Recreation Reserve
 Horomaka Island Recreation Reserve
 Hundalee Recreation Reserve
 King-Turner Scenic Reserve
 Kongutu Recreation Reserve
 Kowhai Pass Recreation Reserve
 Lake Grasmere Recreation Reserve
 Lake Wardell Recreation Reserve
 Le Bons Bay Recreation Reserve
 Lees Valley Recreation Reserve
 Lincoln Park Recreation Reserve
 Little Akaloa Recreation Reserve
 Loch Katrine Recreation Reserve
 Mead Recreation Reserve
 Molesworth Recreation Reserve
 Morven Recreation Reserve
 Mount Nessing Recreation Reserve
 Oaro Recreation Reserve
 Ohoka Stream Recreation Reserve
 Okains Bay Domain Recreation Reserve
 Okains Bay Recreation Reserve
 Omihi Recreation Reserve
 Orari Park Recreation Reserve
 Otamatapaio Recreation Reserve
 Otarama Recreation Reserve
 Oxford Domain Recreation Reserve
 Petit Carenage Recreation Reserve
 Pigeon Bay Domain
 Pleasant Point Recreation Reserve
 Pleasant Valley Recreation Reserve
 Pukerauaruhe Island Recreation Reserve
 Quail Island Recreation Reserve
 Rangitata Recreation Reserve
 Rat Island Recreation Reserve
 Rosewill Recreation Reserve
 Ruapuna Recreation Reserve
 Sage Recreation Reserve
 Sheffield Recreation Reserve
 Springston Recreation Reserve
 Tekapo Domain
 Rat Island Recreation Reserve
 Rosewill Recreation Reserve
 Ruapuna Recreation Reserve
 Sage Recreation Reserve
 Sheffield Recreation Reserve
 Springston Recreation Reserve
 Tekapo Domain
 Temuka Recreation Reserve
 Upper Waitohi Recreation Reserve
 Waiau Rivermouth Recreation Reserve
 Waihora Park Recreation Reserve
 Waikari Recreation Reserve
 Wainui Domain
 Waitohi Bush Recreation Reserve
 Woodend Beach Recreation Reserve Youth Holiday and Recreation

Otago Region

 Abbots Creek Recreation Reserve
 Alexandra Lakeside Recreation Reserve
 Allans Beach Recreation Reserve
 Aramoana Recreation Reserve
 Ascot Road Recreation Reserve
 Awamoko Recreation Reserve
 Ballantynes Road Recreation Reserve
 Beach Bay Recreation Reserve
 Berwick Recreation Reserve
 Blanket Bay - Meiklejohns Bay Recreation Reserve
 Blanket Bay Recreation Reserve
 Blue Lake Recreation Reserve
 Bobs Cove Recreation Reserve
 Brighton Recreation Reserve
 Broad Bay Recreation Reserve
 Butchers Dam Recreation Reserve
 Casa Nova Park
 Catlins Heads Recreation Reserve
 Chard Road Recreation Reserve
 Clutha Riverbank (Clyde) Recreation Reserve
 Clyde Recreation Reserve
 Clyde Town Belt
 Coronet Peak Recreation Reserve
 Craighall Crescent Recreation Reserve
 Damper Bay Lakeside Recreation Reserve
 Daniel O'Connell Recreation Reserve
 Danseys Pass Recreation Reserve
 Diamond Lake Recreation Reserve
 Doctors Point Recreation Reserve
 Dublin Bay-Outlet-Albert Town Recreation Reserve
 Dublin Bay Recreation Reserve
 Earnslaw Burn Recreation Reserve
 Earnslaw Park Recreation Reserve
 False Islet Recreation Reserve
 Frankton Arm Recreation Reserve
 Frankton Golf Course
 Frankton Recreation Reserve
 Fraser River Recreation Reserve
 Geordie Hill Recreation Reserve
 Glendhu Bay Recreation Reserve
 Glenorchy Recreation Reserve
 Glenorchy Road Recreation Reserve
 Gorge Creek Recreation Reserve
 Greenstone Road Recreation Reserve
 Harwood Recreation Reserve
 Hawea Recreation Reserve
 Hills Creek Recreation Reserve
 Johns Creek Recreation Reserve
 Kawarau Falls Recreation Reserve
 Kawarau Gorge Mining Centre
 Kawarau Gorge Recreation Reserve
 Kingston Recreation Reserve
 Kuri Bush Recreation Reserve
 Kuriiti Creek Recreation Reserve
 Kyeburn Recreation Reserve
 Lake Hawea-Western Shore Recreation Reserve
 Lake Kirkpatrick Recreation Reserve
 Lake Rere Recreation Reserve
 Lake Road Recreation Reserve
 Larch View Recreation Reserve
 Long Beach Recreation Reserve
 Macraes Recreation Reserve
 Mahaka Recreation Reserve
 Maniototo Park Recreation Reserve
 Manorburn Dam Recreation Reserve
 Matakaea Recreation Reserve
 Matakanui Recreation Reserve
 Millers Flat Recreation Reserve
 Moke Lake Recreation Reserve
 Morning Star Beach Recreation Reserve
 Motutapu Recreation Reserve
 Mt Alfred Recreation Reserve
 Mt Aurum Recreation Reserve
 Naseby Golf Course Recreation Reserve
 North Otago War Memorial Reserve
 Oamaru Recreation Reserve (Oamaru Racecourse)
 Otago Central Rail Trail
 Oturehua Recreation Reserve
 Oxenbridge Tunnel Recreation Reserve
 Paerau Recreation Reserve
 Papatowai Recreation Reserve
 Patearoa Recreation Reserve
 Pomahaka River Recreation Reserve
 Portobello Recreation Reserve
 Prospect, Woodhaugh, Botanical Gardens
 Quarantine Island/Kamau Taurua Recreation Reserve
 Queenstown-Glenorchy Road Recreation Reserve
 Rastus Burn Recreation Reserve
 Riverside Recreation Reserve
 Roaring Meg Recreation Reserve
 Rotary Park Recreation Reserve
 Ruby Island Recreation Reserve
 Sandymount Recreation Reserve
 Seaton Square Recreation Reserve
 Seven Mile Recreation Reserve
 Shag Point Recreation Reserve
 Slope Hill Recreation Reserve
 St Bathans Recreation Reserve
 St Clair Recreation Reserve
 Taieri Historical Park
 Taieri Lake Recreation Reserve
 Taieri Mouth Recreation Reserve
 Tapanui Recreation Reserve
 Thames Highway-Frome Street Recreation Reserve
 Timaru Creek Recreation Reserve
 Tokomairiro Recreation Reserve
 Truby King Recreation Reserve
 Tuapeka Mouth Recreation Reserve
 Tuapeka Recreation Reserve
 Tuckers Beach Recreation Reserve
 Tweed Street Recreation Reserve
 Twelve Mile Delta Recreation Reserve
 Twenty Five Mile Creek Recreation Reserve
 Waihemo Recreation Reserve
 Waihola Recreation Reserve
 Waikouaiti Racecourse
 Waikouaiti Recreation Reserve
 Waikouaiti Sports Ground
 Waterfall Creek Recreation Reserve
 Wedderburn Recreation Reserve
 Westwood Recreation Reserve
 Wharf Creek Recreation Reserve
 Whitechapel Flat Recreation Reserve
 Willsher Bay Recreation Reserve
 Wilsons Bay Recreation Reserve

References

Protected areas of New Zealand
Lists of tourist attractions in New Zealand
New Zealand environment-related lists